The Heinrich Heine Prize of the Ministry of Culture of the GDR was founded on February 17, 1956 and awarded once a year on December 13, Heine's birthday, for lyrical works and works of literary journalism . The price since 1979 was 10,000 and later 15,000 marks .  1989 the prize was not awarded, but in 1990 for both years. The Ministry of Culture existed until October 1990.

Award winners 

 1957: Karl Schnog, Walther Victor
 1958: Max Zimmering, Bruno Kaiser
 1959: Walter Stranka, Wieland Herzfelde
 1960: Lothar Kusche, Gerd Semmer
 1961: Armin Müller, Peter Edel
 1962: Hermann Kant, Paul Wiens
 1963: Heinz Kahlau, Vladimir Pozner
 1964: Günther Deicke, Hugo Huppert
 1965: Walter Werner, Heinz Knobloch
 1966: Helmut Preißler, Bruno Frei
 1967: Jens Gerlach, Günther Cwojdrak
 1968: Inge von Wangenheim, Uwe Berger
 1969: Helmut Hauptmann, Jo Schulz
 1970: Manfred Streubel, Rolf Recknagel
 1971: Volker Braun, Werner Neubert
 1972: Stephan Hermlin, Hans Kaufmann
 1973: Sarah Kirsch, Gerhard Holtz-Baumert
 1974: Kito Lorenc, Richard Christ
 1975: Eva Strittmatter, Jean Villain
 1976: Dieter Süverkrüp, Heinz Czechowski
 1977: Gisela Steineckert, Jan Koplowitz

 1978: Egon Richter
 1979: Jürgen Rennert
 1980: Rudolf Hirsch
 1981: Renate Holland-Moritz
 1982: John Erpenbeck
 1983: Daniil Granin
 1984: Bernt Engelmann
 1985: Peter Gosse
 1986: Landolf Scherzer
 1987: Manfred Jendryschik
 1988: Peter Rühmkorf
 1989/90: Steffen Mensching, Hans-Eckardt Wenzel

Reference 
 Verleihungsliste zum "Heinrich-Heine-Preis" von 1957 bis 1989.  reviewed April, 7 2021.

German literary awards